The Nashville Sounds Minor League Baseball team has played in Nashville, Tennessee, for 45 years since being established in 1978. As of the completion of the 2022 season, the club has played 6,272 regular-season games and compiled a win–loss record of 3,237–3,035. Combining all 6,365 regular-season and postseason games, Nashville has an all-time record of 3,286–3,079.

Created as an expansion team of the Double-A Southern League (SL) in 1978, the Sounds played in this league through 1984. At the Double-A classification, Nashville was affiliated with Major League Baseball's Cincinnati Reds (1978–1979) and New York Yankees (1980–1984). The Sounds moved up to Triple-A in 1985 as members of the American Association (AA) before joining the Pacific Coast League (PCL) in 1998. They were placed in the Triple-A East (AAAE) in 2021, but this became the International League (IL) in 2022. At this level, they have been affiliates of the Detroit Tigers (1985–1986), Cincinnati Reds (1987–1992), Chicago White Sox (1993–1997), Pittsburgh Pirates (1998–2004), Milwaukee Brewers (2005–2014), Oakland Athletics (2015–2018), and Texas Rangers (2019–2020). The Sounds reaffiliated with the Milwaukee Brewers in 2021.

Nashville reached the postseason in six of their seven years in the Southern League, all by means of winning the Second-Half Western Division title. They went on to win three Western Division titles and two Southern League championships during this period. Their first championship came in 1979 as the Double-A affiliate of the Reds and their second in 1982 as the Double-A affiliate of the Yankees. The Sounds' 13 years in the American Association were less successful. Though Nashville posted eight winning seasons and qualified for the playoffs three times, including twice by virtue of clinching the Eastern Division title, they failed to win an American Association championship. Over 23 years as members of the Pacific Coast League, the Sounds won five division titles, two conference titles, and one Pacific Coast League championship. Their lone PCL title came in 2005 as the Triple-A affiliate of the Brewers. Nashville has made one appearance in the International League playoffs by clinching the Western Division title but has not won an IL championship.

The team's best season record occurred in 1980 when they finished 97–46 (.678) as the Double-A Yankees. Their lowest season record was 57–87 (.396) in 2013 as the Triple-A Brewers. Of the eight Major League Baseball teams with which Nashville has been affiliated, the Sounds experienced their best record as the Double-A farm club of the Yankees from 1980 to 1984. They had a composite season record of 417–306 (.577) and reached the postseason in all five years, winning two Western Division titles and one Southern League championship. Including a postseason mark of 14–14 (.500), their overall record was 431–320 (.574). Conversely, the team's lowest record was as the Rangers' Triple-A club from 2019 to 2020. The Sounds incurred a 66–72 record and did not reach the postseason during the affiliation.

History

Southern League (1978–1984)
The Nashville Sounds were created as an expansion team of the Double-A Southern League (SL) in 1978. The league used a split season schedule wherein the division winners from each half qualified for the postseason championship playoffs. As the Double-A affiliate of the Cincinnati Reds, the Sounds had a losing record and did not qualify for the playoffs in their inaugural 1978 season. This was the only time in which the team finished under .500 and missed the playoffs during their seven years as members of the league. Nashville won six consecutive Second-Half Western Division titles from 1979 to 1984. The 1979 club defeated the Memphis Chicks to win the Western Division title before winning their first Southern League championship against the Columbus Astros. Through two seasons with Cincinnati, the Sounds had a 147–138 (.516) regular-season win–loss record, while they went 5–2 (.714) in the postseason, for a composite record of 152–140 (.521).

Nashville became the Double-A affiliate of the New York Yankees in 1980 and began the partnership by setting their all-time best season record of 97–46 (.678). Despite finishing atop the league standings, they were defeated in the division series by Memphis. In 1981, the team again posted a league-best 81–62 (.566) record and swept Memphis in the division series but lost the SL title to the Orlando Twins. The 1982 Sounds won the division title over the Knoxville Blue Jays and defeated the Jacksonville Suns to capture their second SL championship. Each of the next two seasons ended with their elimination in the division series—by the Birmingham Barons in 1983 and Knoxville in 1984. Of all the Major League Baseball teams with which Nashville has been affiliated, the Sounds experienced their best record with New York from 1980 to 1984. They were 417–306 (.577) in the regular-season and 14–14 (.500) in postseason play, giving them a composite record of 431–320 (.574).

American Association (1985–1997)

The Sounds moved to the Triple-A American Association (AA) in 1985 as an affiliate of the Detroit Tigers. Nashville finished one game over .500 in 1985 and incurred a losing record in 1986, their first since 1978. Over two years with Detroit, they had a 139–144 (.491) record and did not qualify for the playoffs.

Nashville reaffiliated with the Cincinnati Reds at Triple-A in 1987. They qualified for the American Association playoffs for the first time in 1990 by winning the Eastern Division title, but they were defeated by the Omaha Royals in the championship round. Posting an even number of winning and losing seasons over a  six-year span with the Reds, the Sounds had a 429–433 (.498) record, went 2–3 (.400) in their only playoff appearance, and had a composite record of 431–436 (.497). Combining their Triple-A affiliation and the previous Double-A partnership with Cincinnati, they had a record of 576–571 (.502), a 7–5 (.583) postseason record, and were 583–576 (.503) overall.

The Sounds became part of the Chicago White Sox organization in 1993. They reached the postseason that first year with a Western Division title win but lost the AA championship to the Iowa Cubs. Having earned a second-place playoff berth in 1994, they advanced past the New Orleans Zephyrs in the semifinals but lost a second consecutive title versus the Indianapolis Indians. During the five-year affiliation with Chicago, which included four winning campaigns, the Sounds had a season record of 383–335 (.533) and went 7–7 (.500) in postseason play, for a composite of 390–342 (.533).

Pacific Coast League (1998–2020)

Nashville moved to the Triple-A Pacific Coast League (PCL) in 1998 following the disbandment of the American Association after the 1997 season. As an affiliate of the Pittsburgh Pirates, the Sounds reached the postseason for the first time in eight years when they qualified for the PCL playoffs by winning the American Conference Eastern Division title in 2003. They went on to win the American Conference title over the Albuquerque Isotopes, but they lost in the finals to the Sacramento River Cats. All told, Nashville incurred losing records in four out of seven seasons with Pittsburgh in which they had a 490–504 (.493) record, were 3–4 (.429) in their single postseason appearance, and had a composite record of 493–508 (.493).

The Sounds became an affiliate of the Milwaukee Brewers in 2005. That season, the team clinched the American Conference Northern Division title, won the conference title over the Oklahoma RedHawks, and swept the Tacoma Rainiers to win their only Pacific Coast League championship. They made a bid to repeat as PCL champions in 2006 with another division title, but they lost to the Round Rock Express in the conference series. The 2007 Sounds posted a league-leading 89–55 (.618) record, winning the division, but they were eliminated by New Orleans in the first round. The team experienced only four losing seasons in 10 years with the Brewers, including its all-time low of 57–87 (.396) in 2013. At the end of the affiliation with Milwaukee, the longest in team history, they had accumulated a 723–713 (.503) record, a 9–8 (.529) mark in postseason competition, and were 732–721 (.504) overall.

Nashville joined the Oakland Athletics organization in 2015. The 2016 Sounds ended an eight-year playoff drought by clinching the American Conference Southern Division title with a league-best 83–59 (.585) record, but the postseason run ended with a loss to the Oklahoma City Dodgers in the conference series. Over four years with Oakland, Nashville's season record was 289–276 (.512), while they went 2–3 (.400) in their only playoff appearance, for a composite record of 291–279 (.511).

The Sounds affiliated with the Texas Rangers in 2019. With the 2020 season being cancelled due to the COVID-19 pandemic before it began and Major League Baseball's restructuring of Minor League Baseball after the season, this became their only campaign as a Rangers affiliate. With Texas, Nashville had a 66–72 (.478) record, their lowest among all affiliations, and did not qualify for the playoffs.

Triple-A East / International League (2021–present)

In conjunction with the 2021 restructuring of the minor leagues, the Sounds reaffiliated with the Milwaukee Brewers and were placed in the new Triple-A East (AAAE). Instead of holding traditional playoffs to determine a league champion, the team with the best record was declared the winner, but 10 games were added onto the schedule as a postseason tournament, called the Triple-A Final Stretch, in which all 30 Triple-A clubs competed for the highest winning percentage. Nashville finished the tournament tied for fourth place with a 7–2 (.778) record. In 2022, the Triple-A East became known as the International League (IL). The Sounds won the 2022 Western Division title with a league-best 91–58 (.611) record, but they lost a single playoff game to determine the IL championship against the Durham Bulls. Over two seasons as a Brewers affiliate, Nashville holds a 154–114 (.575) record, a 7–3 (.700) postseason record, and a 161–117	(.579) composite record. Combining both the current and former affiliations with Milwaukee, they are 877–827 (.515) in the regular-season and 16–11 (.593) in the postseason, giving them an overall record of 893–838 (.516).

Season-by-season records

Split season records
The Southern League, in which the Sounds competed from 1978 to 1984, used a split season schedule wherein the division winners from each half qualified for the postseason championship playoffs.

Franchise totals

By classification

By league

By affiliation

Notes

References
Specific

General

Seasons